"Sniper Alley" (Serbo-Croatian and Bosnian: Snajperska aleja / Снајперска алеја) was the informal name primarily for streets such as Ulica Zmaja od Bosne (Dragon of Bosnia Street) and Meša Selimović Boulevard, the main boulevard in Sarajevo which during the Bosnian War was lined with Serbian snipers' posts, and became infamous as a dangerous place for civilians to traverse. The road connects the industrial part of the city (and further on, Sarajevo Airport) to the Old Town's cultural and historic sites. The boulevard itself has many high-rise buildings giving sniper shooters extensive fields of fire.

Mountains surrounding the city were also used for sniper positions, providing a safe distance and giving an excellent view on the city and its traffic. Although the city was under constant Serb siege, its people still had to move about the city in order to survive, thus routinely risking their lives. Signs reading "Pazi – Snajper!" ("Watch out – Sniper!") became common. People would either run fast across the street or would wait for United Nations armored vehicles and walk behind them, using them as protective shields. According to data gathered in 1995, the snipers wounded 1,030 people and killed 225 - 60 of whom were children.

In popular culture

  Sniper Alley was fictionally depicted in the film The Peacemaker. 
  Street is featured in Joe Kubert's book Fax from Sarajevo, where it is described as a gauntlet.
  1997 war film Welcome to Sarajevo by director Michael Winterbottom includes several scenes and actual footage of snipers harassing residents of the besieged city.
  1998 television movie Shot Through the Heart produced by HBO, depicts the story of two lifelong friends and expert sharpshooters, who end up on opposing sides during the Siege of Sarajevo. 
  Enki Bilal depicted it in the story in the graphic novel Le Sommeil du monstre.
  2008 documentary Shooting Robert King includes a scene where King mentions that he stood in the middle of Sniper Alley taking pictures unaware of where he was.
 In the 2014 video game This War of Mine, Sniper Junction is a location based on Sniper Alley where players have to run across open ground to avoid sniper fire from a hotel. The game itself is fictional, but is a story based on the Bosnian War in Sarajevo.

See also 

 Siege of Sarajevo
 Urban warfare

References

Siege of Sarajevo
Sniper warfare tactics